Gabriel Alonso Aristiaguirre (9 November 1923 – 19 November 1996) was a Spanish footballer who played as a defender.

Club career
Born in Hondarribia, Basque Country, Alonso played for three clubs in La Liga, Celta de Vigo, Real Madrid and CD Málaga, over the course of nine seasons. He won the 1954 national championship with the second team, but his input consisted of one game, a 1–1 away draw against CA Osasuna.

During an 18-year senior career, Alonso also represented Real Unión, Racing de Ferrol and Rayo Vallecano, retiring in June 1957 at the age of nearly 34 and dying at 73 in his hometown.

International career
Alonso won 12 caps for Spain, during four years. He was selected for the squad that competed in the 1950 FIFA World Cup in Brazil, appearing in all six matches for the eventual fourth-placed nation.

External links

Racing de Ferrol biography 
Celta de Vigo biography 

1923 births
1996 deaths
People from Hondarribia
Spanish footballers
Footballers from the Basque Country (autonomous community)
Association football defenders
La Liga players
Segunda División players
Real Unión footballers
Racing de Ferrol footballers
RC Celta de Vigo players
Real Madrid CF players
CD Málaga footballers
Rayo Vallecano players
Spain B international footballers
Spain international footballers
1950 FIFA World Cup players
Spanish football managers
Real Jaén managers